The Fur Country or Seventy Degrees North Latitude is an adventure novel by Jules Verne in The Extraordinary Voyages series, first published in 1873. The novel was serialized in Magasin d’Éducation et de Récréation from 20 September 1872 to 15 December 1873. The two-volume first original French edition and the first illustrated large-format edition were published in 1873 by Pierre-Jules Hetzel. The first English translation by N. D’Anvers (pseudonym of Mrs. Arthur (Nancy) Bell) was also published in 1873.

Plot summary
In 1859 Lt. Jasper Hobson and other members of the Hudson's Bay Company travel through the Northwest Territories of Canada to Cape Bathurst on the Arctic Ocean on the mission to create a fort at 70 degrees, north of the Arctic Circle. The area they come to is very rich with wildlife and natural resources. Jasper Hobson and his party establish a fort here. At some point, an earthquake occurs, and from then on, laws of physics seem altered (a total eclipse happens to be only partial; tides are not perceived anymore). They eventually realise that they are on an iceberg separated from the sea ice that is drifting south. Hobson does a daily measurement to know the iceberg's location. The iceberg passes the Bering Strait and the iceberg (which is now much smaller, since the warmer waters have melted some parts) finally reaches a small island. A Danish whaling ship finds them. Every member in Hobson's party is rescued and they all survive.

Publication history
1873, UK, London: Sampson Low, Pub date November 1873; first UK edition, translated by N. D'Anvers (Mrs. Arthur (Nancy) Bell), as The Fur Country or Seventy Degrees North Latitude
1874, US, Boston: James Osgood, Pub date 1874; first United States edition
1879, UK, Routledge, Pub date 1879; translation by Henry Frith
1966, UK, London: Arco, Pub date 1966; abridged and edited by I.O. Evans in 2 volumes as The Sun in Eclipse and Through the Behring Strait
1987, Canada, Toronto: NC Press , Pub date October 1987; new translation by Edward Baxter
2008, UK, Classic Comic Store Ltd, Classics Illustrated (JES) #41 facsimile edition (JES13027), retitled "The Floating Island"

References

External links

 
 
  
105 illustrations for The Fur Country by Jules Férat and Alfred Quesnay de Beaurépaire

1873 French novels
Novels by Jules Verne
Novels set in the Northwest Territories
Novels first published in serial form
Works originally published in French magazines
Novels set in Canada
Fur trade